Rick Hooijboer (born 3 August 1974 in Venhuizen) is a Dutch footballer currently playing for Cambuur Leeuwarden.

Career

Amateur career: until 1998
Hooijboer started out playing for local team De Valken. He was discovered by FC Volendam and played there for several years. He returned to his former home town club and before moving to Hollandia in Hoorn two years later. He did very well for the Hoofdklasse club. AZ Alkmaar noticed the 23-year-old West Frisian who at that point became a full pro. He was the first player AZ Alkmaar recruited for Eredivisie season 1998–99. Even though the AZ staff appeared to want him badly, the defender/midfielder was not given a chance to show his skills.

HFC Haarlem: 2000–2005

Cambuur Leeuwarden: 2005–present
Hooijboer left his club HFC Haarlem together with team mate Paul Mulders in 2005. Both men left Haarlem on a free transfer for Cambuur Leeuwarden. The 30-year-old centre back and captain wanted a new challenge after a five year stay in Haarlem. Former Haarlem manager Roy Wesseling (manager of Cambuur at the time) persuaded him to join his new club.

Statistics

References

1974 births
Living people
Dutch footballers
People from Venhuizen
Association football defenders
AZ Alkmaar players
SC Cambuur players
HFC Haarlem players
Eerste Divisie players
Eredivisie players
Footballers from North Holland